The Oregon Veterans Medal of Honor Memorial, or Oregon's Medal of Honor Memorial, is an outdoor memorial commemorating all veterans, and especially Medal of Honor recipients, installed outside the Oregon State Capitol in Salem, Oregon, United States.

Description
The memorial features seven granite pillars on each side of the Oregon State Capitol. East of the building, the pillars surround a flagpole with the American flag, and on the opposite side, the pillars encompass a flagpole with the state flag. Thirteen pillars have a bronze plaque depicting one of thirteen Medal of Honor recipients from Oregon; the fourteenth one lists the names of medal recipients with a connection to the state, but who did not enlist in Oregon. Bob Maxwell's name appears on the fourteenth pillar.

History
The monument was erected by the Oregon State Capitol Foundation and Oregon Veterans Group in 2003.

See also
 Oregon Department of Veterans' Affairs
 Oregon World War II Memorial
 2003 in art
 Kentucky Medal of Honor Memorial
 Medal of Honor Memorial (Indianapolis)
 Texas Medal of Honor Memorial

References

External links

 

2003 establishments in Oregon
2003 sculptures
Granite sculptures in Oregon
Medal of Honor
Monuments and memorials in Salem, Oregon
Outdoor sculptures in Salem, Oregon